Frances Sheila Burberry (born 1960) is a British Anglican priest. Since 5 March 2017, she has been the Dean of Edinburgh in the Scottish Episcopal Church. She has also served as a chaplain of the University of Edinburgh since 2006 and as Rector of St Ninian's Church, Edinburgh since 2011.

References

1960 births
Living people
21st-century Anglican priests
Deans of Edinburgh
Women Anglican clergy